I/We Had a Ball is an album consisting of jazz versions of songs from Jack Lawrence and Stan Freeman's musical I Had a Ball performed by Art Blakey, Milt Jackson, Oscar Peterson, Dizzy Gillespie, Quincy Jones and Chet Baker which was released by Limelight in 1965.

Track listing
All compositions by Jack Lawrence and Stan Freeman
 "I Had a Ball" − 5:00
 "Fickle Finger of Fate" − 2:14
 "Almost" − 4:18
 "Faith" − 5:52
 "Addie's at it Again" − 4:57
 "Coney Island, U.S.A." − 2:25
 "The Other Half of Me" − 3:05
 "Think Beautiful" − 4:18

Personnel

Performance
Tracks 1, 3 & 5:
Quincy Jones – arranger, conductor
Nat Adderley, Dizzy Gillespie, Freddie Hubbard, James Nottingham, Joe Newman − trumpet
Curtis Fuller, Melba Liston − trombone
James Moody, Jerry Dodgion, Phil Woods − alto saxophone
Roland Kirk − tenor saxophone, manzello 
Benny Golson, Lucky Thompson − tenor saxophone
Pepper Adams − baritone saxophone
Milt Jackson − vibraphone
Bob Cranshaw − double bass
Art Blakey − drums

Track 2:
Dizzy Gillespie − trumpet, vocals
James Moody − tenor saxophone, flute
Kenny Barron − piano
Chris White − bass
Rudy Collins − drums

Track 4:
Art Blakey − drums
Lee Morgan − trumpet
Curtis Fuller − trombone
John Gilmore − tenor saxophone
John Hicks − piano
Victor Sproles − bass

Track 6:
Oscar Peterson − piano
Ray Brown − bass
Ed Thigpen − drums

Track 7:
Milt Jackson − vibraphone
McCoy Tyner − piano
Bob Cranshaw − bass
Connie Kay − drums

Track 8:
Chet Baker − flugelhorn, vocals
Bob James − piano
Michael Fleming − bass
Charlie Rice − drums

References

1965 albums
Quincy Jones albums
Dizzy Gillespie albums
Art Blakey albums
Oscar Peterson albums
Milt Jackson albums
Chet Baker albums
Limelight Records albums